The three teams in this group played against each other on a home-and-away basis. The winner Hungary qualified for the eighth FIFA World Cup held in England.

Matches

 

 

 

 

 

Hungary qualified. This is the first time Austria failed to qualify. The previous absences of the Austrian team at World Cup were all due to withdrawals (1938, 1950, and 1962).

Final Table

Team stats

Head coach:  Lajos Baróti

Head coach:  Károly Soós

Head coach:  Eduard Frühwirth

External links
FIFA official page
RSSSF - 1966 World Cup Qualification
Allworldcup

6
1964–65 in Hungarian football
1965–66 in Hungarian football
1964–65 in Austrian football
1965–66 in Austrian football
1964–65 in German football
1965–66 in German football
1964–65 in East German football
1965–66 in East German football